The Toussaint L'Ouverture County Cemetery is an historical African-American cemetery located in Franklin, Tennessee. It was listed on the National Register of Historic Places in 1995. It is named for Toussaint Louverture, the leader of the Haitian Revolution. The earliest recorded burials date from 1869, but it wasn't officially incorporated until 1884. It is "the oldest African American institution in continuous use" in Williamson County.

The cemetery corporation which originally purchased the land and established the cemetery failed during the Great Depression in the United States. After the failure of the cemetery corporation, no entity was named successor and all the members of the original board of trustees have died. Consequently, ownership of the cemetery is unclear and no entity is legally responsible for its maintenance.

Care of the cemetery has been support by the Toussaint L'Ouverture Cemetery Club hosted by the First Missionary Baptist Church in Franklin, TN. The club is a volunteer organization funded by donations and headed by Mattie B. Reeves. Starting in 2013, when the cemetery was added to the Historic Franklin Parks Cell Phone Tour, community support for the cemetery has expanded. On September 11, 2014, in cooperation with the United Way's Days of Caring program, about 150 community volunteers, many from the local Church of Jesus Christ of Latter Day Saints, cleaned the grounds of the cemetery and headstones. On October 24, 2015, the Cemetery Club held another clean-up day.

References

External links
 City of Franklin Historic Parks Audio Tour
 
 

1869 establishments in Tennessee
African-American cemeteries in Tennessee
African-American history of Tennessee
Cemeteries on the National Register of Historic Places in Tennessee
Buildings and structures in Franklin, Tennessee
National Register of Historic Places in Williamson County, Tennessee